Jason Matthew Richwine (born April 21, 1982) is an American political commentator and author. He is best known for his doctoral dissertation entitled "IQ and Immigration Policy," and a Heritage Foundation report he co-authored on the economic costs of illegal immigration to the United States which concluded that passing the Border Security, Economic Opportunity, and Immigration Modernization Act of 2013 would cost taxpayers more than $6 trillion.

Education
Richwine received his bachelor's degree in mathematics and political science from American University, graduating in 2004. He then studied at Harvard University, where he received his PhD in 2009 in public policy, with a dissertation entitled "IQ and Immigration Policy". His dissertation stated that illegal Hispanic immigrants to America had lower IQs than non-Hispanic whites, and noted that this disparity persisted for several generations. The dissertation committee was composed of economist Richard Zeckhauser, economist George Borjas, and Christopher Jencks, the social scientist and editor of The American Prospect. Richwine subsequently wrote an article for Politico defending his dissertation and arguing that the statements it contained about ethnic differences in IQ were "scientifically unremarkable".

Career
Prior to working at Heritage, Richwine worked briefly at the American Enterprise Institute; while there, he wrote a book review for The American Conservative criticizing Richard E. Nisbett's book Intelligence and How to Get It. In 2010, he wrote two pieces about immigration and crime for the online magazine AlternativeRight.com in response to a Ron Unz essay covering the same topic in The American Conservative. After a study co-authored by Richwine regarding the costs of illegal immigration was released by the Heritage Foundation, former Washington Post reporter Dylan Matthews found the dissertation and wrote a blog post about it on May 8, 2013. Richwine argued that Hispanics and blacks are intellectually inferior to whites and have trouble assimilating because of a supposed genetic predisposition to lower IQ. Richwine resigned from the Foundation on May 10, 2013.

As of 2017, Richwine had contributed on occasion to National Review. He continued his controversial research, and published an article in the American Affairs journal entitled "Low-Skill Immigration: A Case for Restriction".

Richwine joined the Heritage Foundation in 2009 after he received his PhD in public policy from Harvard. Titled "IQ and Immigration Policy", he writes on this work:

A later work for the Heritage Foundation released in 2013, of which Richwine is co-author with Robert Rector, claims that the immigration reform bill then being weighed in the U.S. Senate would cost the government $5.3 trillion. As a criticism, on May 6, 2013, Dylan Matthews wrote for The Washington Post: "The study represents the most notable attack on the reform effort to date from a conservative group ... So does the Heritage estimate hold up? Not really. They make a lot of curious methodological choices that cumulatively throw the study into question. It's likely that immigrants would pay a lot more in taxes, and need a lot less in benefits, than Heritage assumes, and that other benefits would outweigh what costs remain."

During the lame duck period of the Trump administration, Trump gave Richwine a position on the National Institute of Standards and Technology.

References

1982 births
Living people
American political commentators
American political writers
American social commentators
American University alumni
Harvard Kennedy School alumni
Race and intelligence controversy
Writers from Philadelphia